The Choir of Gonville and Caius College, Cambridge is a collegiate choir in the University of Cambridge, until recently directed by the Buxtehude scholar Geoffrey Webber. The Director of Music at the college is by tradition known as 'Precentor'. The current Precentor (since April 2020) is Matthew Martin.

Choir
The college awards a number of choral exhibitions every year to incoming students, and these choral exhibitioners make up most of the choir; the choir is also supplemented by a number of volunteers, who are often from other colleges.  The choir sing three services per week during term-time, on Sundays, Tuesdays, and Thursdays. Owing to the Precentor's wide-ranging interests the choir sings an eclectic mix of repertoires, and has developed a niche for resurrecting forgotten repertoires: the CD released in June 2014 is of Celtic chant from the 8th to 12th centuries with the virtuoso piper Barnaby Brown, whilst their most recent recording project, which is yet to be released, is of South American choral music.

Recordings
The Choir releases one or more CDs every year, recently on the Delphian record label. The Choir has recorded several CDs of contemporary composers, such as Judith Weir, Robin Holloway (a fellow of the college), Cheryl Frances-Hoad, and Rodion Shchedrin. Other interesting projects include a reconstruction of the J. S. Bach Mark passion, and a recording with the Choir of King's College, London of Strauss's Deutsche Motette Op. 62 for its centenary.

Tours
The Choir tours three or more times per year. In 2014 the Choir toured Heidelberg, Bogotá, Rio de Janeiro, São Paulo, and Hong Kong.

Discography 

The discography includes :	
 1993 Patrick Hadley / Edmund Rubbra - Sacred Choral Music (CD, Album) ASV, CD DCA 881
 1995 Puccini, Janáček, Geoffrey Webber - Requiem - Mass In E Flat (CD, Album) ASV Digital, CD DCA 914			
 1999 Bach - The Cambridge Baroque Camerata*, Geoffrey Webber - St Mark Passion (2xCD)	ASV, Gaudeamus	CD GAX 237			
 2011 Geoffrey Webber, Annie Lydford, Nick Lee - In Dulci Jubilo (CD, Album) BBC Music Magazine BBC MM339, Vol. 20 No.3			
 2013 Geoffrey Webber, with Choir of King's College London - David Trendell - Deutsche Motette (German Romantic Choral Music From Schubert To Strauss) (CD) Delphian DCD34124		
 2014 Geoffrey Webber & Barnaby Brown - In Praise Of Saint Columba: The Sound World Of The Celtic Church (CD, Album)	Delphian DCD34137	
 2017 Geoffrey Webber, Barnaby Brown, Bill Taylor (20), John & Patrick Kenny - Set Upon The Rood: New Music For Choir & Ancient Instruments (CD, Album)	Delphian DCD34154

References

External links
 Website

Gonville and Caius College, Cambridge
Culture of the University of Cambridge
Cambridge choirs
University choirs